The United Order Family of Christ was a schismatic sect of the Church of Jesus Christ of Latter-day Saints (LDS Church), which was founded in 1966 in Denver, Colorado, by David-Edward Desmond and existed until at least 1973−74.

The United Order Family of Christ was founded specifically for young gay men only, ages 18 to 30. Because they practiced a uniquely Mormon form of communalism called the United Order in which they held "everything in common", Desmond affirmed that the Family was "not for the great majority of the Gay LDS". Desmond's title as the President of the Church was First Key. He may have solemnized same-sex marriages between people in his congregation.

This Mormon schismatic church was the third gay Christian church founded in the United States, the first being a Catholic schism founded by Father George Hyde in 1946 in Atlanta, Georgia, and called the Eucharistic Catholic Church, which later moved to New York City. The second is the Metropolitan Community Church, founded by the Revd Troy D Perry in 1968 in Los Angeles. Desmond's Homosexual Church of Jesus Christ of Latter-day Saints lasted at least until 1973, when Desmond was still corresponding with David C. Martin (then editor of the Restoration Reporter), and probably until 1974.

David Edward Desmond

David E. Desmond was born in 1940, in Spokane, Washington, to 19-year-old Joyce Betty Grasty and her husband Desmond (first name unknown). He married Sally Jo Hathaway from Costa Mesa, California in the St. George Utah Temple on 8 Dec 1965, though, they presumably separated shortly after. He lived in Denver, Colorado, during the 1960s and 1970s. He died on 11 May 1983, in Pullman, Washington. Grace Lutheran Church's Rev. Vernon Johnson held the funeral and he was buried in Fairmount Memorial Park, Spokane, Washington.

See also

 Law of adoption
 LGBT-affirming churches
 Queer theology
 Restoration Church of Jesus Christ
 Secret Gospel of Mark

References

Further reading
 Feliz, Antonio A. Out of the Bishop's Closet San Francisco:1988 Alamo Square Press

External links
 "Same Sex Temple Sealings: Did the Early LDS Church Embrace Homosexual Relationships?", Salt Lake Metro, September 2004

Christian denominations established in the 20th century
Defunct Latter Day Saint denominations
Latter Day Saint movement in Utah
LGBT churches in the United States
LGBT Latter Day Saint organizations
Liberal Mormon denominations in the Latter Day Saint movement
Organizations disestablished in the 1970s
Christian organizations established in 1966